Robert Lee Holloman (1953 – January 8, 2007) was a Democratic member of the North Carolina General Assembly who represented the state's fourth Senate district, including constituents in Bertie, Chowan, Gates, Halifax, Hertford, Northampton, and Perquimans counties. Holloman lived in Ahoskie, North Carolina and was a pastor at Nebo Missionary Baptist Church in Murfreesboro. Holloman died in January 2007 after being elected in November 2006 to his third term in the state Senate. He died one day after his fellow Hertford County legislator, Howard J. Hunter, Jr. Robert Lee Holloman was the son of Daraious and Beatrice Vaughan Holloman.

Notes

North Carolina state senators
People from Ahoskie, North Carolina
1953 births
2007 deaths
20th-century American politicians
21st-century American politicians